, is a 1979 Japanese anime television film directed by Eiji Okabe. The movie is also sometime listed as Anne Frank Monogatari: Anne no Nikki to Douwa yori (アンネ・フランク物語 -アンネの日記と童話より- lit. "The Story of Anne Frank - From Anne's Diary and Fairy Tales-"). 

The film is notable for being the first animated adaptation of Anne Frank's The Diary of a Young Girl (1942–1944) and it was co-produced by Nippon Animation and TV Asahi to commemorate Anne's 50th birthday. The movie uses four of Anne's short fantasy stories as interludes to her confinement. It also features an interview with Anne's father Otto Frank, and real live action footage from Nazi concentration camps and Netherlands landscapes. It aired on TV Asahi on 28 September 1979 from 21:00 to 22:22. It is said to have started the subgenre of child-focused anime about war such as Barefoot Gen and Grave of the Fireflies. The film is currently unavailable, having never been re-broadcast or released to home video.

Plot 
The story follows the life of a 13-year-old jewish girl named Anne Frank, hiding with her family and some friends in an Amsterdam attic to escape the Nazis during World War II.

Cast

Music 
Opening Theme

 "There is a Tomorrow with Love" (愛がある明日がある, Ai ga aru ashitagāru)

 Sung by Seagulls, lyrics by Tokiko Iwatani, music and arrangement by Kōichi Sakata.

Ending Theme

 "The Girl who Became a Seagull" (かもめになった少女, Kamome ni natta shōjo)

 Sung by Seagulls, lyrics by Tokiko Iwatani, music and arrangement by Kōichi Sakata.

See also 

 Lists of animated feature films

References

External links 

 Official site
 
 Anne no Nikki: Anne Frank Monogatari at Anime News Network
 Anne no Nikki: Anne Frank Monogatari at MyAnimeList

1979 anime films
1979 television films
1979 films
Anime television films
1970s Japanese-language films
Films set in Europe
Historical anime and manga
Nippon Animation films
TV Asahi original programming